Valerio Bernabò (born 3 March 1984 in Rome) is a retired Italian rugby union player. He has also been selected for the Italian national team with 33 caps, making his debut in 2004 against the USA. He also captained the Italian under-21 team.  His usual position was at lock.

He played for CA Brive in 2007/08. In June 2010 he joined until 2013-2014 season Benetton Treviso for the 2010/11 Celtic League season and from 2014 to 2018 he played with Zebre

References

External links
RBS 6 Nations profile

1984 births
Living people
Sportspeople from Rome
Italian rugby union players
Rugby union locks
CA Brive players
Benetton Rugby players
Italy international rugby union players